Coenzyme Q6 monooxygenase is a protein that in humans is encoded by the COQ6 gene.

Function

The protein encoded by this gene belongs to the ubiH/COQ6 family. It is an evolutionarily conserved monooxygenase required for the biosynthesis of coenzyme Q10 (or ubiquinone), which is an essential component of the mitochondrial electron transport chain, and one of the most potent lipophilic antioxidants implicated in the protection of cell damage by reactive oxygen species. knockdown of this gene in mouse and zebrafish results in decreased growth due to increased apoptosis.

Clinical significance 

Mutations in this gene are associated with autosomal recessive coenzyme Q10 deficiency-6 (COQ10D6), which manifests as nephrotic syndrome with sensorineural deafness. Alternatively spliced transcript variants encoding different isoforms have been described for this gene.

References

External links